Veene Venkatagiriyappa (26 April 1887 – 1951) was a musician and music teacher from Heggadadevanakote in the Mysore district of India.

Venkatagiriyappa's initial musical training was under his uncle Chikka Subba Rao, and he later studied under and was greatly influenced by Veene Sheshanna. He was also exposed to western classical music by the director of the orchestra maintained by the Maharaja. Venkatagiriyappa later compiled a collection of Carnatic classical compositions rendered using Western musical notation.

Venkatagiriyappa was an Asthana Vidwan(Court Musician) of the Mysore Darbar, and composed many carnatic classical songs in Western Style.

His famous compositions include:
1) Sharadhe Shubrahare (Raga Sharadapriya)
2) Nagma (Ragas: Hindola, Keeravani, Behaag)
many more

His Son Veenapraveena Vidwan Srinivas Prasanna is also a renowned Veena Player.

Sources
 "Sangita Samaya", by S Krishnamurthy

Carnatic composers
Saraswati veena players